A granulosa cell or follicular cell is a somatic cell of the sex cord that is closely associated with the developing female gamete (called an oocyte or egg) in the ovary of mammals.

Structure and function
In the primordial ovarian follicle, and later in follicle development (folliculogenesis), granulosa cells advance to form a multilayered cumulus oophorus surrounding the oocyte in the preovulatory or antral (or Graafian) follicle.

The major functions of granulosa cells include the production of sex steroids, as well as myriad growth factors thought to interact with the oocyte during its development. The sex steroid production begins with follicle-stimulating hormone (FSH) from the anterior pituitary, stimulating granulosa cells to convert androgens (coming from the thecal cells) to estradiol by aromatase during the follicular phase of the menstrual cycle. However, after ovulation the granulosa cells turn into granulosa lutein cells that produce progesterone.  The progesterone may maintain a potential pregnancy and causes production of a thick cervical mucus that inhibits sperm entry into the uterus.

Embryology of ovarian granulosa cells 
In the development of the urinary and reproductive organs, the oogonia become invaginated in the gonadal ridge.

The embryological origin of granulosa cells remains controversial. In the 1970s, evidence emerged that the first cells to make contact with the oogonia were of mesonephric origin. It was suggested that mesonephric cells already closely associated with the oogonia proliferated throughout development to form the granulosa cell layer. Recently, this hypothesis has been challenged with some thorough histology. Sawyer et al. hypothesized that in sheep most of the granulosa cells develop from cells of the mesothelium (i.e., epithelial cells from the presumptive surface epithelium of the ovary). In 2013, it was proposed that both granulosa cells and the ovarian surface epithelial cells are instead derived from a precursor cell called gonadal-ridge epithelial-like cell.

Granulosa Cell Types 
Cumulus Cells (CC) vs Mural Granulosa Cells (MGC)

Cumulus cells surround the oocyte. They provide nutrients to the oocyte and influence the development of the oocyte in a paracrine fashion. Mural granulosa cells line the follicular wall and surround the fluid-filled antrum. The oocyte secretes factors that determine the functional differences between CCs and MGGs. CCs primarily support growth and development of the oocyte whereas MGCs primarily serve an endocrine function and support the growth of the follicle. Cumulus cells aid in oocyte development and show higher expression of SLC38A3, a transporter for amino acids, and Aldoa, Eno1, Ldh1, Pfkp, Pkm2, and Tpi1, enzymes responsible for glycolysis. MGCs are more steroidogenically active and have higher levels of mRNA expression of steroidogenic enzymes such as cytochrome P450. MGCs produce an increasing amount of estrogen which leads to the LH surge. Following the LH surge, cumulus cells undergo cumulus expansion, in which they proliferate at a ten-fold higher rate than MGCs in response to FSH. During expansion CCs also produce a mucified matrix required for ovulation.

Cell culture
Cell culture of granulosa cells can be performed in vitro. Plating density (number of cells per volume of culture medium) plays a critical role for the differentiation. A lower plating density makes granulosa cells exhibit estrogen production, while a higher plating density makes them appear as progesterone producing theca lutein cells.

Ovarian aging

In the female rhesus monkey, DNA double-strand breaks increase in granulosa cells with age, and the ability to repair such DNA breaks declines with age.  These changes at the DNA level in granulosa cells may contribute to ovarian aging.

Additional images

See also 

 Granulosa cell tumour
 Ovulation
 Membrana granulosa
List of human cell types derived from the germ layers

References

External links
  - "Female Reproductive System: ovary, cumulus oophorus"
  - "Female Reproductive System: ovary, membrana granulosa"
 

Steroid hormone secreting cells
Human female endocrine system